Bröderna fara väl vilse ibland (Brothers lose their way at times), is a song by the Swedish poet and performer Carl Michael Bellman, from his 1790 collection, Fredman's Epistles, where it is No. 35. The epistle is subtitled "Angående sin Sköna och hännes obeständighet." (About his beautiful girl, and her unreliability). The first verse ends "My girl has forgotten me, I'll die faithful. Night and day in drunkenness, shall all my sorrow pass away."

The epistle has been called one of Bellman's most radical and innovative. He uses several metrical devices to counteract the simple beat of the melody. The epistle is about drinking, but has been praised by critics such as Lars Warme for having risen far above that song-form. The first couplet plays humorously on a verse from the Bible, singing not of the danger of sin but of picking up the wrong glass in a tavern. Fred Åkerström recorded two different versions of the Epistle, giving the text new life and depth.

Context

Song

Melody and verse form 

The tune is a variant of a melody from Pierre Laujon's opera Silvie, Act II, Scene 5. The epistle has five verses, each of twelve lines. The rhyming pattern is ABAA-ABAA-CBCC. The epistle is dated 14 December 1771.

Lyrics 

The epistle paints a picture of a man (the watchmaker Fredman) at the end of his wits, disappointed in love, trying to forget his feelings in drink, and recalling how he "gave her gifts and gold". He compares himself to a bird snared in a trap "and I scarcely even have death as a friend". In the last verse he recalls her skin "and her eyes' burning games" he feels his heart "heavy as lead", but at last he curses her: "Damn you for betraying me!", and says enough.

Reception and legacy 

The musicologist James Massengale points out that in this epistle, Bellman has used an array of devices to counteract the "metrically plodding melody". He uses anadiplosis (repeating the last word of a clause at the start of the next) in verse 3 with "...skaffa jag barnet; barnet det dog,..." and again in verse 4; he uses epanalepsis (repeating the first word of a clause at its end) in verse 3, with "Men, min Anna Greta, men!", and again in verse 5; and anaphora (repeating a word at the starts of neighbouring clauses) in verse 4, "häll den på hjärtat, häll man fyra!", and again in verse 5. Massengale observes that good musical poetry, like this epistle, is always a compromise, as it has both to fit its music or be no good as a musical setting, and to contrast with its music, or be no good as poetry. The final verse, containing all three metrical devices, is not, argues Massengale, an example of "decay", but shows Bellman's freedom, change of focus (from lament to acceptance), and the closure of the epistle.

The literary historian Lars Warme observes that a Bellman epistle "is related to a drinking song only by derivation. As an artistic achievement [the form] stands alone in the history of Swedish poetry." Warme chooses Epistle 35 as an example of a work risen far above "a drinking song".

The first couplet is a humorous play on a verse from a Biblical epistle, James 1:16, which runs:

  Do not go astray, my beloved brethren.

The verse meant that the brothers should not fall into sin. Bellman's Epistle, however, supposes that going astray meant picking up the wrong glass in a tavern.

Jennie Nell, writing for the Bellman Society, describes Epistles 35 and 43 ("Värm mer öl och bröd") as undoubtedly the most radical and innovative. They were often chosen by female singers in the twentieth century, picking up on Fredman's "perplexed and troubled" voice. Epistle 35 in particular has, writes Nell, often been portrayed with "a comic undertone", but in fact it expresses "dark feelings" of jealousy, anger, and sadness, as Fredman, dropped by his lover, tries to dull his despair with drink.

The song has been recorded by Fred Åkerström, differently on two albums, Fred sjunger Bellman and Glimmande nymf; writing in Dagens Nyheter, Martin Stugart observes that Åkerström's deep voice and "rumbling throat" gave the text new life and depth, and that audiences "couldn't get enough of his interpretations" of the song, alongside other favourites like Epistle 23, "Ack, du min moder" and Epistle 72, "Glimmande nymf".
Other solo singers who have recorded the Epistle include the noted Bellman interpreters Sven-Bertil Taube, and Cornelis Vreeswijk. Many recordings of Epistle 35 have been placed on YouTube. The epistle has been translated into English by Eva Toller.

References

Sources

 
 
 
  (contains the most popular Epistles and Songs, in Swedish, with sheet music)
  (with facsimiles of sheet music from first editions in 1790, 1791)

External links 

 Text of Epistle 35

1790 compositions
Swedish songs
Fredmans epistlar